The West of Scotland Marine Protected Area covers a large area of the North Atlantic to the west of the Outer Hebrides. The Marine Protected Area (MPA) was designated by the Scottish Government in 2020, replacing the Rosemary Bank MPA, which covered a much smaller area.

The MPA covers a diverse range of marine landscapes. Moving west, these include: the steep gradient of the continental slope; the sediment plains of the Rockall Trough; and the rising slopes of George Bligh Bank and the Rockall Bank. The area also includes two isolated seamounts: Anton Dohrn and Rosemary Bank. It protects several important habitats including deep-sea sponge aggregations and cold water coral reefs and gardens. Six species of deep-sea fish are specifically protected within the MPA: blue ling, orange roughy, leafscale gulper shark, gulper shark, Portuguese dogfish and round-nose grenadier.

References

External links
West of Scotland Marine Protected Area - YouTube video produced by the Joint Nature Conservation Committee

Nature Conservation Marine Protected Areas of Scotland
Atlantic Ocean